Combomune is a small town in southern Mozambique.  It lies on the north side of the Limpopo River.

Combomune is an important hydrometric station along the Limpopo.

Transport 

The town is served by a way-station of the southern line of the Mozambique Railways.

See also 

 Transport in Mozambique

References 

Populated places in Gaza Province